Mimusops caffra (coastal red milkwood, Sepedi: Mmupudu) is a species of tree in family Sapotaceae. This tree is found in coastal dune vegetation in Southern Africa from the Eastern Cape, through KwaZulu-Natal to southern Mozambique.

Description
Mimusops caffra is a small to medium-sized tree. These trees may reach  in height, but are shorter on the seaward side of the dunes  where they rarely exceed 5m tall and where the foliage suffers under salt spray and sea winds.

The leaves are alternate, hard and leathery with rounded or blunt tips. Older leaves are blue-green above and paler on the underside. Young leaves are light green.
 

Ecological significance
The fruit are eaten by people, vervet monkeys, bushpigs, Cape parrots, black-bellied glossy starlings and yellow-streaked bulbuls. These trees serve to lift the vegetative canopy in coastal dune vegetation, thereby allowing space and protection for more delicate plant species such as Isoglossa woodii (which is fed on by blue duiker) and the large-leaved dragon tree (Dracaena aletriformis). The robust structure of these trees also allows support for climbing plants such as Rhoicissus rhomboidea. Monkeys and birds spread the seeds of Mimusops caffra, which are also buoyant and often wash up along the shore.

Conservation status
Mimusops caffra is protected (in South Africa) in terms of the National Forest Act of 1998. Protected tree species may not be cut, disturbed, damaged or destroyed, and their products may not be possessed, collected, removed, transported, exported, donated, purchased or sold, except under licence granted by the Department of Forestry or a delegated authority.

References

caffra
Protected trees of South Africa